Doksy is a town in Česká Lípa District in the Liberec Region of the Czech Republic. It has about 5,200 inhabitants. It is known for Lake Mácha and its summer vacation resort.

Administrative parts
Villages of Břehyně, Kruh, Obora, Staré Splavy, Vojetín, Zbyny and Žďár are administrative parts of Doksy. Vojetín forms an exclave of the municipal territory.

Etymology
The town's name is derived from the Old English word wiktionary:dox ("dark"), which refers to the dark places in the swamps near Dokský stream.

The German name Hirschberg am See means "deer hill by lake". A deer is seen on the symbols of the town.

Geography
It lies in the Ralsko Uplands. The Robečský Stream flows through the town. Doksy lies on the shores of Lake Mácha pond, fed by the stream. There are several other ponds in the territory. Large part of the territory lies in the Kokořínsko – Máchův kraj Protected Landscape Area.

History
The town was probably established along with the nearby Bezděz Castle by King Ottokar II of Bohemia in 1264. Because it is questioned whether the founding document really concerns today's Doksy, a deed from 1293 is considered as the first trustworthy mention of Doksy.

In 1367, Charles IV established a pond here, which was the crucial moment for the future development of Doksy. Charles IV also promoted the settlement to a town. The importance of Doksy has increased from 1553, when it became the centre of a separate estate. At the end of the 16th century, its owner Jan of Vartenberk has built a castle and a manor house here. From 1595, the estate was owned by the Berka of Dubá family. After the Battle of White Mountain, their properties were confiscated and Doksy was acquired by Albrecht von Wallenstein. From 1680 until 1945, Doksy was owned by the Waldstein family.

Since the 1880s, Doksy is known as recreational area and a spa resort. In 1928, the first big beach was established. In the 1950s, the spa was cancelled, but the tourism of the lake did not stop and further developed.

Until 1918, Hirschberg in Böhmen was part of the Austrian monarchy (Austria side after the compromise of 1867), in the Dauba (Dubá) district, one of the 94 Bezirkshauptmannschaften in Bohemia.

Following the Munich Agreement in 1938, it was annexed by Nazi Germany and administered as part of Reichsgau Sudetenland. The German-speaking population was expelled in 1945 and replaced by Czech settlers.

Demographics

Sights

The most important monument is Doksy Castle. The castle from the end of the 16th century was baroque rebuilt in the 18th century. Today it is open to the public and offers sightseeing tours.

The Church of Saint Bartholomew and the Assumption of the Virgin Mary was built in 1686–1689 according to design by Jean Baptiste Mathey, on the site of an old church from the first half of the 14th century. The church was baroque rebuilt in the 18th century. The tower was modified in 1832.

The folk architecture in the village of Vojetín is well preserved and the village is protected by law as a village monument zone.

Twin towns – sister cities

Doksy is twinned with:
 Bolków, Poland
 Oybin, Germany

References

External links

Cities and towns in the Czech Republic
Populated places in Česká Lípa District